Gerald Phipps (March 4, 1915 – August 6, 1993) was a businessman, President of Gerald H. Phipps, Inc., a construction company, and owner of the Denver Broncos American football club from 1961 to 1981.

Phipps and Cal Kunz purchased the Broncos from founder Bob Howsam in May 1961 for less than $1 million. Phipps was chairman of the National Football League Finance Committee from 1970 to 1981. During Phipps's tenure as owner, the Broncos earned their first trip to the Super Bowl (in 1978) participating in Super Bowl XII and saw a significant rise in Denver Broncos popularity, called "Broncomania".  In 1985, Phipps became the first non-player to be inducted into the Broncos Ring of Fame.  He is also a member of the Colorado Sports Hall of Fame.

Phipps was also the owner of the Denver Bears minor league baseball team. He was a director of Rocky Mountain Empire Sports Inc., which owned the Denver Bears minor league baseball team from 1947 to 1984 

Gerald Phipps graduated with a BA in English from Williams College. He and his brother Allan were inducted into the Colorado Business Hall of Fame.

References

1915 births
1993 deaths
Williams College alumni
American construction businesspeople
Denver Broncos owners
20th-century American businesspeople